Ranunculus hyperboreus is a species of flowering plant belonging to the family Ranunculaceae.

It is native to Subarctic and Subalpine Northern Hemisphere.

References

Ranunculaceae